Ondrej Mikula (born July 3, 1988) is a Slovak professional ice hockey winger who currently plays for Vlci Žilina of the Slovak 1. Liga.

Mikula previously played in the Czech Extraliga for HC Vítkovice and in the Tipsport Liga for MHk 32 Liptovský Mikuláš, MHC Martin, HK Dukla Trenčín, HC '05 Banská Bystrica, ŠHK 37 Piešťany and HK Poprad.

On August 22, 2019, Mikula joined Comarch Cracovia of the Polska Hokej Liga. On July 11, 2020, Mikula returned to Slovakia to sign for Vlci Žilina of the Slovak 1. Liga.

References

External links

1988 births
Living people
HC '05 Banská Bystrica players
MKS Cracovia (ice hockey) players
MHK Dolný Kubín players
HK Dukla Trenčín players
HC Havířov players
Imatran Ketterä players
Kokkolan Hermes players
MHk 32 Liptovský Mikuláš players
MHC Martin players
ŠHK 37 Piešťany players
HK Poprad players
HC RT Torax Poruba players
HC Shakhtyor Soligorsk players
Slovak ice hockey left wingers
Sportovní Klub Kadaň players
HC Vítkovice players
Yertis Pavlodar players
People from Bánovce nad Bebravou
Slovak expatriate ice hockey players in the Czech Republic
Slovak expatriate ice hockey players in Finland
Expatriate ice hockey players in Poland
Expatriate ice hockey players in Kazakhstan
Slovak expatriate sportspeople in Belarus
Expatriate ice hockey players in Belarus
Slovak expatriate sportspeople in Kazakhstan
Slovak expatriate sportspeople in Poland
Sportspeople from the Trenčín Region